The Almon Asbury Lieuallen House  was added to the National Register of Historic Places in 1978. Located at 101 S. Almon St. in Moscow, Idaho in Latah County the house was built in 1884. The structure has a mansard roof and two-story bays on either side of the entrance. The structure originally had a smaller covered porch, and the bays were more visible than at present. A small  railed balcony atop the porch was accessible by a door on the second floor. That door has been replaced by a window, and the porch expanded to cover the entire east side of the facade. Additional dormer windows have been added on the third floor to provide additional lighting and ventilation for the top floor. The structure has always been used as a residence, first as a family home, then as apartments. It is currently used as multi-family apartments.

The wooden structure was built outside the town of Moscow on his farm and occupied by Almon Asbury Lieuallen and his family. One of the early settlers of Moscow, he operated one of the first stores and was postmaster in 1876.

See also
 National Register of Historic Places listings in Latah County, Idaho

Notes

Houses in Latah County, Idaho
Houses on the National Register of Historic Places in Idaho
Buildings and structures in Moscow, Idaho
National Register of Historic Places in Latah County, Idaho
Houses completed in 1884